Blackburn is an industrial town and the administrative centre of the Blackburn with Darwen borough in Lancashire, England. Blackburn is the core centre of the wider unitary authority area along with the town of Darwen. It is one of the largest districts in Lancashire, with commuter links to neighbouring cities of Manchester, Salford, Preston, Lancaster, Liverpool, Bradford and Leeds.

At the  2011 census, Blackburn had a population of 117,963, whilst the wider borough of Blackburn with Darwen had a population of 150,030. Blackburn had a population of 117,963 in 2011, with  30.8% being people of ethnic backgrounds other than white British.

A former mill town, textiles have been produced in Blackburn since the middle of the 13th century, when wool was woven in people's houses in the domestic system. Flemish weavers who settled in the area in the 14th century helped to develop the woollen cottage industry. The most rapid period of growth and development in Blackburn's history coincided with the industrialisation and expansion of textile manufacturing.

Blackburn's textile sector fell into decline from the mid-20th century and subsequently faced similar challenges to other post-industrial northern towns, including deindustrialisation, economic deprivation and housing problems. Blackburn has had significant investment and redevelopment since 1958 through government funding and the European Regional Development Fund.

History

Toponymy

The origins of the name has been suggested that it may be a combination of the River Blakewater, and an Old English word "burn", meaning stream.  Local author William Abram cited the ancient name as Blake Burne in his 1877 book, Parish of Blackburn, County of Lancaster: A History of Blackburn, Town and Parish. Abram also confirms that the region, later known as the Blackburn Hundred, was known as Blakeburneshyre. Blackburn was recorded in the Domesday Book as Blacheborne in 1086. By the time of John Speed's map of 1610, the spelling of the town was Blackburn, while the region was Blackburne. There is anecdotal speculation that the name of the town may simply mean "black burn", or "black stream".

Prehistory
There is little evidence of prehistoric settlement in the Blakewater valley, in which Blackburn developed. Evidence of activity in the form of two urn burials has been discovered from the Bronze Age in the hills around Blackburn. In 1879, a cinerary urn was discovered at a tumulus at Revidge, north of the town; another was excavated in 1996 at Pleasington Cemetery, west of the town, by gravedigger Grant Higson. The presence of a sacred spring—perhaps in use during the Iron Age—provides evidence of prehistoric activity in the town centre, at All Hallows Spring on Railway Road.

Roman era
Blackburn is located where a Roman military road crossed the river Blakewater. The road linked Bremetennacum Veteranorum (Ribchester) and Mamucium (a major Roman fort that occupied Castlefield in Manchester). The route of the road passed east of Blackburn Cathedral and probably crossed the river in the Salford neighbourhood just east of the modern town centre. It is not clear whether the road predated the settlement.

George C. Miller, in his Blackburn: The Evolution of a Cotton Town, says:

The ancient military way from Mamucium (Manchester) to (Bremetennacum) (Ribchester), passing over Blacksnape, plunges on its unswerving course through Blackamoor, over the scarp at Whinney Heights, to pass across the Blakewater in the vicinity of Salford. This fact alone presents a reasonable argument for the existence of a British oppidum or walled village on the site, it being customary for such primitive communities to cluster in the vicinity of a ford or bridge.

According to William Abram (1877):

The Parish of Blackburn contains many interesting vestiges. Three of the four principal roads constructed by the Romans in Lancashire traversed some portion of the Parish : —I. The lower road from the south to Carlisle, intersected the township of Walton-in-le-Dale. 2. The road from Manchester to Overborough crossed the Parish at its broadest part. 3. The road from the sea to the interior, which formed the conmiunication between the "Sistuntian Port" (on the Wyre) and Ribchester, Ilkley-in-Wharfedale, Aldborough andYork, enters Blackburn Parish at Ribchester, by a ford over the Ribble. The late Rev. E. Sibson, in a paper on the Roman Roads of the Wigan district, speaks of a road of this kind which branched off eastward from Blackrod, "Street-fold and Water-street, near Rivington, and by White Hough, in Tockholes, to the small Roman station at Blackburn, near the new road to Preston."

Roman temple spring at All Hallows
All Hallows Spring was excavated by Antiquarians in 1654 and found to contain an inscribed stone commemorating the dedication of a temple to Serapis by Claudius Hieronymus, legate of Legio VI Victrix.

Middle Ages

Christianity is believed to have come to Blackburn by the end of the 6th century, in either 596 (as there is a record of a "church of Blagbourne" in that year) or 598 AD. The town was important during the Anglo-Saxon era when the Blackburnshire Hundred came into existence as a territorial division of the kingdom of Northumbria.

The name of the town appears in the Domesday Book as Blachebourne, a royal manor during the days of Edward the Confessor and William the Conqueror. Archaeological evidence from the demolition of the medieval parish church on the site of the cathedral in 1820 suggests that a church was built during the late 11th or early 12th century. A market cross was also erected nearby in 1101. The manor came into the possession of Henry de Blackburn, who divided it between his two sons. Later, one half was granted to the monks of Stanlow Abbey and this moiety was subsequently granted to the monks of Whalley Abbey. During the 12th century, the town's importance declined as Clitheroe became the regional centre. In addition to a settlement in the town centre area, there were several other medieval domiciles nearby.

Industrial Revolution and textiles

Textile manufacturing in Blackburn dates from the mid-13th century, when wool produced locally by farmers was woven in their homes. Flemish weavers who settled in the area in the 14th century developed the industry. By 1650 the town was known for the manufacture of blue and white "Blackburn checks", and "Blackburn greys" became famous not long afterwards. By the first half of the 18th century textile manufacture had become Blackburn's main industry. From the mid-18th to the early 20th century Blackburn evolved from a small market town into "the weaving capital of the world", and its population increased from less than 5,000 to over 130,000.

John Bartholomew's Gazetteer of the British Isles provides a profile of Blackburn in 1887:

Blackburn. parl. and mun. bor., parish and township, NE. Lancashire,  E. of Preston and  NW. of London by rail – par., 48,281 ac., pop. 161,617; township, 3681 ac., pop. 91,958; bor., 6974 ac., pop. 104,014; 4 Banks, 2 newspapers. Market-days, Wednesday and Saturday. It is one of the chief seats of cotton manufacture, besides producing calico, muslin, &c., there being over 140 mills at work. There are also factories for making cotton machinery and steam-engines. Blackburn has been associated with many improvements in the manufacture of cotton, among which was the invention (1767) of the "spinning jenny" which was invented in nearby Oswaldtwistle by James Hargreaves, who died in 1770. There are several fine churches and public buildings. A Corporation Park (50 ac. in area) is on the outskirts of the town. Several lines of railway converge here, and pass through one principal station belonging to the Lancashire and Yorkshire Ry. Co. B. returns 2 members to Parliament.

From around 1750, cotton textile manufacturing expanded rapidly. Supplied with cotton by merchants, and paid by the piece, cottagers spun cotton into thread and wove it into cloth. The merchants arranged for cloth to be bleached and dyed.

After 1775, spinning mills were built in the town. Early mills were warehouse conversions; the first purpose-built spinning mill was constructed in 1797 and by 1824 there were 24. The number of spindles reached 2.5 million  by 1870 and spinning mills were constructed up to that time – 24 since 1850. Spinning declined between 1870 and 1900 as the sector transferred to south Lancashire.

In 18th-century Blackburn, weaving was primarily undertaken by handloom weavers working from their own cottages. However, as powerlooms were introduced into the mills after 1825, the percentage of handloom weavers began to decline and this occurred more rapidly in areas closer to the town. Handloom weavers continued to make up a sizable portion of the workforce in outlying rural areas. The last handloom shop in Blackburn closed in 1894.

1800s
In 1807, the Daniel Thwaites & Co brewery was established; the company is still in business today and is now based at Sykes Holt in Mellor.

Improvements to the power loom in the early 1840s, and the construction of a railway line in 1846, led to greater investment in power looms in Blackburn in the second half of that decade. The railway brought opportunities for expansion of the cotton trade, and in subsequent decades many new mills were constructed: between 1850 and 1870, sixty-eight weaving-only and four combined weaving/spinning mills were built and nine weaving mills were built per decade between 1870 and 1890.

Improvements in power loom efficiency meant that weaving, the primary source of wealth and income for handloom weavers, began to transfer from the cottage industry to factories. This led to high rates of unemployment: according to figures published in March 1826, some 60 per cent of all handloom weavers in Blackburn and Rishton, Lower Darwen and Oswaldtwistle were unemployed. High unemployment led to the Lancashire weavers' riots. At 3:00 pm on 24 April 1826, a mob arrived in Blackburn after attacking power looms in Accrington. Proceeding to Bannister Eccles' Jubilee Factory on Jubilee Street, the mob destroyed 212 power looms in the space of 35 minutes. They then turned their attention to John Houghton and Sons' Park Place factory, located nearby, and destroyed another 25 looms, before seeking more machinery to attack. The crowd began to disperse at around 6:00 pm, troops having arrived at 3:30 pm to try to quell the rioting.

20th-century decline of the cotton industry
In 1890, Blackburn's Chamber of Commerce had recognised that the town was overly dependent on the cotton industry, warning of the dangers of "only having one string to their bow in Blackburn". The warning proved prophetic when, in 1904, a slump hit the cotton industry and other industries dependent on it, such as engineering, brewing and building. In 1908, another slump saw 43 mills stop production and a quarter of the town's looms lay idle. 

During the First World War suspension of trade with India resulted in the expansion of colonial British India's cotton industry at the expense of Britain's, and the imposition of an 11 per cent import tariff by the colonial British Government led to a dramatic slump in trade in 1921, a situation which worsened in 1922 after the Indian Government raised the tariff to 14 per cent. This caused the number of stopped mills to increase to 47, with 43,000 looms lying idle. Two years into the slump, Foundry and Limbrick Mills became the first to close permanently.

Not long afterwards, in 1926, the General Strike saw production suspended at half the town's mills and 12,000 unemployed.

In 1927, Matthew Brown & Co. relocated to the town's Lion Brewery, on Coniston Road, following their acquisition of local brewer Nuttall & Co, later the subject of a hostile takeover by Scottish & Newcastle Breweries in 1987, ceasing brewing in 1991.

In 1928, there was another slump in textile production, and another strike in 1929 after employers requested a 12% wage cut; 40,000 cotton workers struck for a week and eight mills closed, making 28 closures in six years. By the start of 1930, 50 mills had shut and 21,000 people were unemployed. A financial crisis in 1931 led to 24,000 unemployed, with 1,000 houses and 166 shops lying empty in the town. A total of 26 mills closed down between 1930 and 1934.

1948 mass fingerprinting
Blackburn became the first town to undertake the mass fingerprinting of people following the murder of June Anne Devaney in May 1948. June Anne Devaney was a three-year-old patient at Queens Park Hospital when she was abducted from her cot and murdered in the hospital grounds on 15 May 1948. Fingerprints on a bottle underneath her cot led the police to fingerprint every male over the age of 16 who was present in Blackburn on 14 and 15 May 1948. After taking over 46,500 sets of fingerprints, a match was made with Peter Griffiths, a 22-year-old ex-serviceman. Griffiths admitted his guilt and his trial ascertained if he was sane or not. After deliberating for 23 minutes, the jury found him sane and he was hanged at Liverpool Prison on Friday 19 November 1948. After his conviction, the police destroyed all fingerprints they had taken.

1948–1999
Between 1948 and 1950 the textile industry experienced a short post-war boom, during which sales increased, industry training methods improved and automatic looms were introduced, which allowed a single weaver to control 20 to 25 looms. Loom sheds were rebuilt to house new, larger looms. Despite the post-war boom, the cotton industry continued to decline and only 25 per cent of the town's population were employed in textiles by 1951; this figure had stood at 60 per cent up to the beginning of the Great Depression in 1929. In 1952 the number of weavers fell from 10,890 to 9,020. By 1955 more cloth was imported from India than was exported and between 1955 and 1958 another 16 mills closed. In 1959, due partly to the re-organisation of the textile industry as a result of the Textiles Act, another 17 mills closed. By 1960 there were 30 mills operating in Blackburn.

Closures continued in the 1960s with The Parkside, Fountains, Malvern and Pioneer Mills shutting in 1964. In 1967 the Eclipse Mill at Feniscowles closed, unable to compete with imported cloth sold at nine pence cheaper per yard than the mill could produce. By the end of that year there were 26 mills operating. The 1970s saw further closures, and the number of textile workers in Blackburn reduced to 6,000 by January 1975, the year in which the Albion and Alston mills stopped production with the loss of 400 jobs. In 1976 there were 2,100 looms in operation in the town, compared with 79,405 in 1907.

21st century

Governance
This section describes the organisation of government in the area. For information on party politics and local issues see the section on politics below
Blackburn is administered by Blackburn with Darwen unitary authority, which encompasses Blackburn and the small town of Darwen to the south. The town sends one Member of Parliament (MP) to the House of Commons.

Local government

The council has been elected "by thirds" since 1996 In its 2007 Comprehensive Performance Assessment (CPA), the Audit Commission described the council as "improving well" and gave it the highest "four star" overall performance rating.

Although children's services, adult social care and GCSE results were praised, the commission highlighted "significant health problems" and increased "levels of repeat victims of domestic violence" as causes for concern. Despite generally good performance, overall user satisfaction levels with the council are below average and not improving. The borough has Beacon Council status and shares its best practice in education policy with other councils as part of the scheme.

Parliamentary representation
The historic constituency of Blackburn was created for the 1832 general election and sent two Members of Parliament (MPs) to Westminster until it was abolished in 1950 and replaced for one parliamentary term by two new single-member constituencies, Blackburn East and Blackburn West. At the 1955 general election, Blackburn East and Blackburn West were merged into the modern-day constituency which is relatively tightly formed and returns a single MP.

Coat of arms

The coat of arms of the former Blackburn Borough Council has many distinctive emblems. The blazon of the arms is: Argent a Fesse wavy Sable between three Bees volant proper on a Chief Vert a Bugle stringed Argent between two Fusils Or. On the crest, a Wreath of the Colours a Shuttle Or thereon a Dove wings elevated Argent and holding in the beak the Thread of the Shuttle reflexed over the back and an Olive Branch proper.

The motto, granted on 14 February 1852 to the former Borough of Blackburn, is poignant, as Blackburn, once a small town, had risen to importance through the energy and enterprise of her spinners and manufacturers, combined with the skill and labour of her operatives. The Borough of Blackburn was formed by the amalgamation of the County Borough of Blackburn, the Borough of Darwen, part of the Turton Urban District and the parishes of Yate and Pickup Bank, Eccleshill, Livesey, Pleasington and Tockholes from the Blackburn Rural District.

Politics
Blackburn council and its successor have been predominantly controlled by the Labour Party since 1945 and continuously for 19 years until May 2007 when it fell into no overall control. UKPollingReport characterises the constituency of Blackburn as "a mix of deprived inner-city wards dominated by Muslim voters, white working class areas and Conservative voting suburbs". Until 2015, the MP was the former Secretary of State for Justice and former Foreign Secretary Jack Straw. Previous MPs for Blackburn include the former Labour cabinet minister Barbara Castle from 1945 to 1979. The distribution of seats as of May 2018 was 44 seats for the Labour Party, 17 for the Conservatives and 3 for the Liberal Democrats.

Far-right
In the 1970s Blackburn experienced its first significant wave of Asian immigration and became a focus for far-right politics. In 1976, two National Party councillors were briefly elected, including John Kingsley Read.

In July 1992, white and Asian youths rioted for several nights in Blackburn, with incidents taking place including an arson attack on a café which had allegedly been a meeting place for local Asians involved in organised crime.

Although some towns in the North of England suffered race riots in the summer of 2001, the streets of Blackburn were undisturbed and the disturbance of the Summer 2011 riots was minimal.

The next resurgence of support for the far right came in 2002; The incumbent Liberal Democrats were pushed into third place behind Labour. Commenting on the elections, Blackburn MP Jack Straw said: "It is very sad. We had the far right in Blackburn 26 years ago when they won two seats in Shadsworth. But there the whole community decided they wouldn't have it. You can never say they won't put candidates in Blackburn but we will work hard on community relations."

Nationalists / Localists
The council until prior to 2008 had two members for the England First party, Mark Cotterill for Meadowhead ward and Michael Johnson for Fernhurst. Mark Cotterill has since stood down and Michael Johnson joined the For Darwen party. Members of the BNP won a council seat in the town in November 2002 following elections in May which saw three of their colleagues elected in nearby Burnley. The BNP's Robin Evans secured a 16-vote majority in Mill Hill ward with two recounts following a campaign using pub meetings and leafleting. Robin Evans resigned from the party in October 2003.

Geography

The Ribble Valley and West Pennine Moors lie to the north and south respectively. Blackburn experiences a temperate maritime climate, like much of the British Isles, with relatively cool summers and mild winters. There is regular but generally light precipitation throughout the year.

The town is bounded on other sides by the towns of Accrington to the east and Darwen to the south.

The towns of Rishton, to the east, and Great Harwood, to the northeast, are both in the local government district of Hyndburn.  further east lies the town of Burnley.

Geology and terrain

 Located in the midst of the East Lancashire Hills, some areas of the town are characterised by steep slopes.

The River Blakewater, which gives its names to the town, flows down from the moors above Guide and then through the areas of Whitebirk, Little Harwood, Cob Wall and Brookhouse to the town centre. The river is culverted and runs underground in the town centre, under Ainsworth Street and between Blackburn Cathedral and the Boulevard. On the western side of the town centre the Blakewater continues through the Wensley Fold area before joining the River Darwen outside Witton Country Park; the Darwen flows into the River Ribble at Walton-le-Dale.

The geology of the Blackburn area yields numerous resources which underpinned its development as a centre of manufacturing during the Industrial Revolution. Mineable coal seams have been used since the mid-late 16th century. The Coal Measures in the area overlie the Millstone Grit which has been quarried in the past for millstones and, along with local limestone deposits, used as a construction material for roads and buildings. In addition, there were deposits of iron ore in the Furness and Ulverston districts.

The Blackburn area was subjected to glaciation during the Pleistocene ice age, and the sandstone-and-shale bedrock is overlain in much of the area by glacial deposits called till (which is also called "boulder clay") of varying thickness up to several tens of feet. Glacial outwash (sand and gravel) also occur in small patches, including along Grimshaw Brook.

Green belt

Blackburn is within a green belt region that extends into the wider surrounding counties, and is in place to reduce urban sprawl, prevent the towns in the nearby Greater Manchester and Merseyside conurbations from further convergence, protect the identity of outlying communities, encourage brownfield reuse, and preserve nearby countryside. This is achieved by restricting inappropriate development within the designated areas and imposing stricter conditions on permitted building.

Sizeable areas of green belt exist within the borough, west and south of Blackburn surrounding Witton Country Park and Pleasington parish, with other parishes in the borough containing portions of green belt, Tockholes, Eccleshill, Yate and Pickup Bank parish, Livesy, Darwen, with North Turton largely covered.

Demography
According to further statistics from the same census, this time defining Blackburn as a Westminster parliamentary constituency, the population was 69.22 per cent White British (national average for England 89.99 per cent) with significant Indian (14.31 per cent) and Pakistani (11.45 per cent ) ethnic minorities. 12.33 per cent of the population was born outside the European Union. In terms of religion, 57.53 per cent of residents were Christian (average for England 71.74 per cent), 25.74 per cent Muslim (average for England 3.1 per cent) and 15.98% no religion or not stated.

With regard to the economic activity of those aged 16–74, the 2001 Census indicates that 33.93 per cent were full-time employees (average for England 40.81 per cent), 11.72 per cent part-timers, 5.97 per cent self-employed (average for England 8.32 per cent), and 4.5 per cent unemployed (average for England 3.35 per cent).

The 2001 census also records the social grade of the constituency's 72,418 people aged 16 and over: using the NRS social grades system, 10,748 were classed as AB (higher and intermediate managerial/administrative/professional), 17,514 as C1 (supervisory, clerical, junior managerial/administrative/professional), 11,691 as C2 (skilled manual workers), 19,212 as D (semi-skilled and unskilled manual workers), and 13,253 as E (on state benefit, unemployed, lowest grade workers).

Additionally, Blackburn with Darwen Borough Council manages a site for Gypsies and travellers, in the Ewood area of the town.

The 2011 census showed that there was an increase in the number of people of ethnic minorities living within the Blackburn with Darwen area. Results showed that 31 per cent of people in the area were of an ethnic minority background, with 66.5 per cent defined as white British. This equates to roughly 45,500 people within Blackburn with Darwen being of a minority ethnic group – a level three times greater than the average across Lancashire and the rest of the region.

In 2011 Blackburn had 117,963 residents, of whom:

62.7% White (60.0% White British)
34.3% Asian
0.7% Black

There is a distinct contrast between different areas with ethnic groups due to segregation. Areas south and west of the town centre such as Ewood have an indigenous majority, with all wards in the area being more than 85 per cent White British. In contrast, most wards north and east of the town centre have an Asian majority, but also a small but increasing community of people from mainland Europe.

Economy
As of 2007, the town centre was subject to a multimillion-pound investment, and Blackburn with Darwen Council have already made some refurbishments and renovations of key public places, notably the Church Street area with its Grade II listed classical style Waterloo Pavilions complemented by street furniture and sculptures. As of 2006, The Mall Blackburn (formerly known as Blackburn Shopping Centre) was the main shopping centre in Blackburn with over 130 shops and 400 further outlets close by. in June 2011, Blackburn Market opened in a new site under the shopping centre and opened six days a week (Monday–Saturday). The previous market was based on the other side of Ainsworth Street. It first opened on this site in 1964, where there was a three-day market (Wednesday, Friday and Saturday) and the Market Hall (Monday–Saturday).

The town centre was expanded by construction of the Grimshaw Park retail development (including Blackburn Arena) in the 1990s. The adjacent Townsmoor Retail Park and Peel Leisure and Retail Park are more recent developments.

in May 2008, one of the town's most well-known shops, the shoe store Tommy Ball's, closed due to insolvency. The town's oldest store, Mercer & Sons, also closed after a decline in sales blamed on the credit crunch. It opened in 1840 and was originally an ironmonger, but it converted to selling toys, household goods and hardware. In January 2009 the directors of the company announced that the shop would close after a 30-day statutory consultation, unless they changed their minds or a buyer was found.

Markets continue to offer a wide range of local produce, such as Lancashire cheeses, tripe, Bowland beef and lamb. Walsh's Sarsaparilla stall decided not to join the move into the Mall shopping centre in 2011, and opens six days a week.

Major employers in Blackburn include: Blackburn College, Thwaites Brewery, BAE Systems (Samlesbury Aerodrome site, located at Samlesbury, northwest of Blackburn); Blackburn with Darwen Borough Council; and the East Lancashire Hospitals NHS Trust (based at the Royal Blackburn Hospital).

Drumstone Trade Park near the town centre has trade outlets.

Numerous business parks exist in and around the town.

Transport

Railway

Blackburn railway station is sited in the town centre and is managed by Northern Trains, who also operate all of its passenger services. It is on the Ribble Valley line between Clitheroe and Manchester Victoria; trains to Manchester typically take around 50 minutes and continue on to Rochdale. The station also hosts East Lancashire Line services eastwards to Burnley, Colne, Leeds and York; services westwards go to Preston and Blackpool.

Buses
Blackburn's new bus station in Ainsworth Street opened in May 2016. A new interchange was built outside the station as part of the Cathedral Quarter redevelopment, where all buses continue to the bus station.

Air
Manchester Airport, the busiest airport in the UK outside London, provides scheduled flights.

Waterways
The Leeds and Liverpool Canal runs through Blackburn from Feniscowles in the south-west to Whitebirk in the north-east, skirting the town centre to the east of Blackburn railway station. This important early industrial artery arrived in 1810 and became the chief focus for industrial growth in the 19th century, with raw cotton imported via Liverpool.  While it suffered neglect in the wake of the area's industrial decline, the Blackburn stretch has benefited from a number of regeneration projects since the 1990s. British Waterways residential moorings are to be found at Finnington Lane Bridge on the western edge of the borough.

Roads
The M65 motorway passes to the south of Blackburn. Junction six of the motorway is located at the eastern edge of Blackburn, near the Intack area; junctions five and four are located to the south, near the village of Guide and the Lower Darwen area, respectively; and junction three is located at the south-western edge of the town, close to the Feniscowles area. The M65 links Blackburn to the national motorway network, connecting to junction nine of the M61 and junction 29 of the M6.

Other major roads in and around Blackburn include the A666 and the A677. It passes through the town centre and continues south through the towns of Darwen and Bolton, then south-west to the town of Pendlebury, near Manchester, where it joins the A6 at Irlams o' th' Height. It passes through the centre of the town and continues to the western outskirts. It then heads north-west to the village of Mellor Brook before continuing west towards the city of Preston. Barbara Castle Way, named after the former local MP, runs from Montague Street to Eanam Roundabout; it passes close to the town centre as part of the A6078 town centre orbital route.

Landmarks

Cathedral

Blackburn Cathedral was formerly St Mary's Parish Church. It was reconsecrated in 1826 on the site of a previous church that had stood for several hundred years. In 1926 the Diocese of Blackburn was created and the church gained cathedral status. Blackburn was selected above other locations for the new wave of Archbishop Temple's cathedrals because of its then excellent public transport infrastructure – the cathedral stands next to the bus and railway station. Between the 1930s and 1960s an enlarged cathedral was built using the existing building as the nave. Six of the cathedral's bells were cast in 1737 and are claimed to derive from even older bells. An image of the cathedral is used behind BBC interviews filmed at BBC Radio Lancashire in Darwen Street, opposite the cathedral.

Ewood Park

The ground was opened in AprIl 1882. Work on the redeveloped, all-seater stadium got underway in February 1993 when the old Darwen End stand was demolished. This stand, with the old Blackburn End stand, was redeveloped before the Nuttall Street stand was also demolished ready for redevelopment in January 1994. Almost two years later, on 18 November 1995, the new Ewood Park was officially opened. With a capacity of 31,367, it consists of four sections: the Darwen End, Riverside Stand (so named as it stands on the banks of the River Darwen), Blackburn End, and Jack Walker Stand, named after a Blackburn industrialist and club supporter. The stadium also has conference and banqueting facilities.

Queen Victoria's statue

Blackburn's statue of Queen Victoria stands next to the cathedral grounds overlooking the Cathedral Square. Victoria's fourth daughter, Princess Louise, Duchess of Argyll, unveiled the statue on 30 September 1905. It was sculpted by the Australian Sir Bertram McKennal out of white Sicilian marble and stands on a grey granite plinth.

Town Hall

The construction of Blackburn's original, Italian Renaissance style Town Hall was completed in 1856 at a cost of £35,000, equivalent to about £1.5 million as at 2008. The architect was James Paterson and the contractors were Richard Hacking and William Stones. It originally housed a police station with 18 cells, a large assembly room, and a council chamber. A tower block extension was constructed in 1969 at a cost of £650,000, equal to about £6.6 million as at 2008. The tower block is not strictly an extension to the earlier building: the two buildings are connected only by an elevated, enclosed footbridge. The two buildings are known locally as the New Town Hall and Old Town Hall respectively.

Technical School

The school was built in the Northern Renaissance style and has a slate roof, an attic, a basement and two intermediate storeys. Made mainly of red brick and yellow terra cotta, it is profusely decorated. There are ornate gables, a round-arched entrance with angled turrets and balcony above; in addition, there is a frieze below the top storey with panels depicting art and craft skills.  A Grade II listed building, it is now part of Blackburn College. The Prince of Wales placed a time capsule in the wall of the college during his visit. The college celebrated its 125th anniversary in 2013.

Other landmarks

The Wainwright Bridge was opened in June 2008. The £12 million bowstring arch bridge crosses the East Lancashire and Ribble Valley railway lines west of the town centre and forms part of the A6078 Town Centre Orbital Route. The bridge is named after Alfred Wainwright, after a vote by the townspeople. Blackburn Arena, opened in 1991, houses an ice rink and is home to the Blackburn Hawks ice hockey team.

Blackburn railway station features a  mural by the Ormskirk-based artist Stephen Charnock. It shows eight famous faces associated with the town, including Mohandas Gandhi, who visited nearby Darwen in 1931. The station was renovated in 2000. BBC Radio Lancashire has its studios in Darwen Street in the town centre. Thwaites Brewery, which produces cask ale, has had a position in the centre of the town since 1870. There is also King George's Hall, which is an arts and entertainment centre and Thwaites Empire Theatre. A section of the Leeds and Liverpool Canal runs through the town. St Anne's Roman Catholic Church is also situated in the centre of the town, is a Lombard Romanesque church, built in 1926, destroyed by arson in 2002 and rebuilt in 2004. The Canterbury Street drill hall was completed in 1870.

Parks

It opened on 22 October 1857, with shops and mills closing for the day, church bells ringing and flags flying from public buildings. Railway companies claimed 14,000 people travelled to the opening. A conservatory was opened on 16 May 1900. Corporation Park contains the Blackburn War Memorial which commemorates those who lost their lives in the two World Wars. The town's annual Armistice parade concludes at the war memorial.

The town's Queen's Park was opened in June 1887, having been laid out at a cost of £10,000 on land acquired by Blackburn Corporation from the Ecclesiastical Commissioners in 1882. Two additional bowling greens and a pavilion were added in 1932.

Witton Country Park is a  space to the west of the town. The land was purchased in 1946 and was the ancestral home of the Feilden family. It is larger than all the town's other parks and playing fields put together. Witton Park High School is located within the park, as are three astroturf football pitches and a full-size athletic track, which is home to the Blackburn Harriers. The Blackburn model aircraft club also uses the park for radio-controlled aircraft. Pleasington cemetery and crematorium lie on its edges.

Roe Lee Park, in the north of the town, opened on Wednesday 30 May 1923 to commemorate a visit by George V. It was originally a  site with five tennis courts and three bowling greens. The borough council website describes it as a  "urban fringe park with bowling greens, kick around area and children's playground". In 2007, all four parks described here were winners of Green Flag awards.

Blackburn Cemetery is located to the north of the town centre in Roe Lee.

Libraries
Blackburn Central Library, located in the town centre close to the Town Hall, is described as "the seventh most visited library in England". The library has various sections and facilities, including: an information and reference section, a media section, a community history section, a children's library, and a creche. An ICT training suite at the library has been named the "Bill Gates Room". Blackburn has smaller libraries for the Mill Hill, Livesey and Roman Road parts of the town, and a mobile library service.

Education
See List of schools in Blackburn with Darwen
Secondary education in Blackburn is provided by nine state-funded schools and one private school. In 2005, Tauheedul Islam Girls' High School became the first Muslim state school in the North West. It had previously been an independent school. Since then Tauheedul Islam Boys' High School has been established and Queen Elizabeth's Grammar School joined the state-funded sector.

The town also has a few special schools. St Thomas's and Sunnyhurst Pupil Referral Unit educates children unable to attend mainstream school for health reasons or other difficulties.

Over £25 million was invested in educational initiatives in Blackburn with Darwen in the late 2000s, including new schools, city learning centres and children's centres. Over 11,000 adults take part in some form of educational programme. Blackburn with Darwen council has twice had Beacon Status for education in the "Fostering School Improvement" and "Transforming the School Workforce" categories. Compared with 56.5 per cent nationally, 51.3 per cent of pupils in Blackburn with Darwen achieve grades A*–C. The average GCE/VCE A/AS and Equivalent Point Score per Student is 649.7, compared with 716.7 nationally.

Although the town's proportion of ethnic minorities is below 25%, in some schools the vast majority of pupils are from the ethnic minority population, whilst other schools are almost entirely white. This has been identified as a problem to racial integration in the town.

The independent school sector is represented by Westholme School and Jamiatul Ilm Wal Huda.

The two further education colleges in the town are Blackburn College and the sixth-form St. Mary's College. The town does not have a university, but some higher education courses for over-18s are provided by the East Lancashire Institute of Higher Education (ELIHE).

Sport

Football

EFL Championship side Blackburn Rovers is based at the Ewood Park stadium. It was established in 1875, becoming a founder member of The Football League in 1888. In 1890 Rovers moved to its permanent home ground at Ewood Park. Until the formation of the Premier League in 1992, most of Blackburn Rovers' success was pre-1930, when they won the league twice and FA Cup six times. After finishing runners-up to Manchester United in 1993–1994, Rovers won the English Premier League the following year. In 2002 they won the League Cup.

Ice hockey
Blackburn has an Olympic-sized ice rink housed at the 3,200-seat Blackburn Arena. The arena is the home of the Blackburn Hawks and Lancashire Raptors ice hockey teams, both of which play in the English National Ice Hockey League.

Cricket
Although Lancashire County Cricket Club play inter-county cricket at Old Trafford Cricket Ground, the town club at Alexandra Meadows on Dukes Brow is the East Lancashire Cricket Club.

Blackburn Northern Cricket Club states it has recently leased the Ribchester Cricket Ground for its matches.

Cultural references

Blackburn is mentioned in The Beatles' song "A Day in the Life".
I read the news today—oh, boy
4,000 holes in Blackburn, Lancashire
And though the holes were rather small
They had to count them all
Now they know how many holes it takes to fill the Albert Hall.

The title of the unofficial fanzine of the town's football club, Blackburn Rovers, is 4,000 Holes, and the 1968 Beatles film Yellow Submarine has John mentioning the lyric as well in the "Sea of Holes".

In 1975, documentary filmmaker Nick Broomfield made Juvenile Liaison about a juvenile liaison project in the town. It examines a series of children and their run-ins with the law, including minor wrongdoings such as theft, truancy and being abusive to parents. After its production, the film was banned by the British Film Institute for many years; Juvenile Liaison revolved mainly around the activities of Sergeant Ray, whose preventive measures for dealing with young troublemakers fell mainly in the strong-arm category. In 1990, Nick Broomfield returned to Blackburn to film a follow-up. Juvenile Liaison 2 revisits some of the residents from the first film, in an attempt to measure the success of the scheme.

The 1994 TV film Pat and Margaret starring Victoria Wood and Julie Walters was partly filmed in Blackburn.

The TV show Hetty Wainthropp Investigates, screened on BBC One from 1996 to 1998, included many scenes shot in Blackburn.

The 2005 British film Love + Hate, directed by Dominic Savage, was shot in Blackburn.

The film-makers Mitchell and Kenyon were based in Blackburn in the early 20th century. Much of their film stock, some 800 negatives, was found in their old premises on Northgate in 1994 and is now in the safekeeping of the aforementioned British Film Institute.

St Peter's Burial Ground
During late 2015, work done on St Peter's Burial Ground in advance of road construction involved disinterring the remains of nearly 2,000 individuals buried there during the cemetery's period of operation (1821–1945). The burial ground had been connected with the former St Peter's Church, a large one that seated some 1,500 people, which was demolished in 1976. Archaeologists found that nearly half of the bodies were those of young children, who appeared to have died quickly during the mid-19th century from illnesses affected the lungs and gastrointestinal system. The numbers are taken as reflecting the massive increase in the city's population during that period due to its booming textile industry, which led to unhealthy living situations among the working classes.

The remains were to be relocated to another section of the cemetery. A memorial service conducted by Julian Henderson, the Bishop of Blackburn, for those being re-buried was scheduled to be held during the summer of 2016.

Notable people

Politics and industry

Jack Walker, steel baron and once owner of the local steel company Walkersteel, was born in the town in 1929 and lived locally until he moved to the Channel Islands in 1974. He was a former owner of Blackburn Rovers.

In politics, William Henry Hornby, a leading industrialist, the first mayor of Blackburn, and Chairman of the Conservative Party was born in the town in 1805. John Morley, 1st Viscount Morley of Blackburn, OM, PC, Liberal statesman, writer and newspaper editor was born in the town in 1838. The town had close links with Barbara Castle, an MP in Blackburn for 34 years (1945–1979) and holder of the positions of Secretary of State for Employment and Productivity, First Secretary of State and Secretary of State for Social Services under Labour governments of the 1960s and 1970s. Sajjad Karim (born 1970) served as a Member of the European Parliament for the North West England between 2004 and 2019.

Mohsin Issa and Zuber Issa are owners of EG Group.

A showman born in Blackburn named Frederick Kempster was dubbed "The English Giant" at a height of 7'9. He lived from 1889–1918 and remains one of England's Tallest People in History by the Guinness Book of Records.

Arts and music
Tony Ashton (1946–2001), rock musician
Michael Billington (1941–2005), actor, star of UFO
William Billington (1825–1884), writer, known as the "Blackburn Poet"
Josephine Cox (1938–2020), fiction writer
Ross Eccles (born 1937), contemporary artist; many of his paintings feature scenes and landmarks of Blackburn and Lancashire
Kathleen Ferrier (1912–1953), contralto
Michael Gibson (born 1980), television presenter and documentary director
Barry Gray (1908–1984), composer
Kathleen Harrison (1892–1995), actress
Tez Ilyas (born 1983), stand-up comedian
Russell Harty (1934–1988), broadcaster
Ethel Carnie Holdsworth (born Ethel Carnie; 1886–1962), writer and feminist
Lee Mack, (born 1968), actor/comedian
Grace Davies, (born 1997), singer/songwriter
Sarah Martin (born 1974), musician, member of Belle and Sebastian
Ian McShane (born 1942), actor
Tony O'Neill, (born 1978), author
Steve Pemberton (born 1967), actor 
Wendi Peters (born 1968), actress
Ronald Stevenson (1928–2015), Scottish composer
Jeanette Threlfall (1821–1880), Christian hymnist and poet
Debbie Travis (born 1960), television host
Anthony Valentine (1939–2015), actor
Diana Vickers (born 1991), singer and actress
Alfred Wainwright (1907–1991), guidebook author
Jon Walmsley (born 1956), musician and actor
Michael Winterbottom (born 1961), film maker 
William Woodruff (1916–2008), historian and author
 AJ Odudu (born 1988), television host

Sport
Gareth Ainsworth (born 1973), footballer and football manager
Farakh Ajaib (born 1991), snooker player
Iain Balshaw (born 1979), England rugby union player
Bernard Cafferty (born 1934), chess player, author and translator
Albert Clough (1901–1957), professional footballer
Matt Derbyshire (born 1986), footballer for Bradford City
Anastasios Donis (born 1996), footballer for Stade Reims and Greece
Keith Duckworth (1933–2005), motor-racing engine designer
David Dunn (born 1979), footballer for Blackburn Rovers and England, then football coach 
Russell Edmonds (born 1977), former cricketer
Frank Fielding (born 1988), footballer for Stoke City
Carl Fogarty (born 1965), four time motorcycle World Superbike champion
Joe Garner (born 1988), footballer for Carlisle United
Will Greenwood (born 1972), England rugby union player
Connor Mahoney (born 1997), footballer for Huddersfield Town
William Marsden (born 1871), footballer
Oliver Newby (born 1984), cricketer for Lancashire
Geoffrey Phillips (born 1931), England cricketer
Anthony Pilkington (born 1988), footballer
John Sumner (1936–2004), rock climber
William Townley (1866–1950), footballer and coach
Adam Wharton (born 2004), footballer for Blackburn Rovers, younger brother of Scott
Scott Wharton (born 1997), footballer for Blackburn Rovers, elder brother of Adam

Sciences
Timothy Leighton (born 1963), Ultrasonics and Underwater Acoustics professor, Institute of Sound and Vibration Research, University of Southampton
Barbara Mawer (1936–2006), biochemist and medical researcher
Noel Slater (1912–1973), mathematician and astronomer
Eric Fawcett (1927–2000), professor in the Department of Physics at the University of Toronto, credited with discovering the Hall effect in type-II superconductors

Twin towns

See also

Listed buildings in Blackburn

Notes and references
 Notes

 References

Bibliography

External links

Blackburn with Darwen Council
 The Shuttle: News for Blackburn with Darwen Council
 Photographic history of Blackburn with Darwen as influenced by the development of the cotton trade.

 
Towns in Lancashire
Towns with cathedrals in the United Kingdom
Unparished areas in Lancashire
West Pennine Moors
Geography of Blackburn with Darwen